Karl-Heinz Scheffer is a former West German slalom canoeist who competed from the late 1960s to the mid-1970s.

He won four medals in the C-2 team event at the ICF Canoe Slalom World Championships with two golds (1969, 1973), a silver (1971) and a bronze (1967).

References
Overview of athlete's results at canoeslalom.net

German male canoeists
Possibly living people
Year of birth missing (living people)
Medalists at the ICF Canoe Slalom World Championships